"Rake and Ramblin' Man" is a song written by Bob McDill, and recorded by American country music artist Don Williams.  It was released in July 1978 as the third single from the album Country Boy.  The song reached number 3 on the Billboard Hot Country Singles & Tracks chart

Charts

Weekly charts

Year-end charts

References

1978 singles
1978 songs
Don Williams songs
Songs written by Bob McDill
ABC Records singles